2,5-Dihydroxycinnamic acid is a hydroxycinnamic acid. It is an isomer of caffeic acid.

Preparation
2,5-Dihydroxycinnamic acid is produced by Elbs persulfate oxidation of o-Coumaric acid.

See also
Homogentisic acid
Gentisic acid

References 

Hydroxycinnamic acids
Hydroquinones
Vinylogous carboxylic acids